Victor Hasson (1957 – January 10, 2005), also known as Vico was a Belgian (born in Burundi) businessman who started multiple companies.

Career 
Victor Hasson, also known as "Vico", graduated from the Université libre de Bruxelles with a degree in medicine. After graduating, Victor quickly realized that Medicine was not for him and decided to join his family's business.

CityHotel 
Created by his uncles and managed by Victor and his brother Albert, the Hasson's most successful business was the City Hotel group. The company was later sold to the KBC Group.

European Belgian Airline (EBA) 
Hasson started the European Belgian Airline, a low-cost company built off of the old market share from Trans European Airways. It was later resold to Virgin Group (with chairman Richard Branson) who created Virgin Express.

City Bird 
In 1996, he created the low cost airline Citybird, which company filed for bankruptcy in 2001.

Birdy 
After Citybird, he started the Birdy company, reselling it to SN Brussels Airlines in 2004.

References 

1957 births
2005 deaths
Businesspeople in aviation
20th-century Belgian businesspeople